Abou El Hassen is a town and commune in Abou El Hassan District, Chlef Province, lying on the Mediterranean Sea, northern Algeria. According to the 1998 census the settlement has a population of approximately 20,164. The commune is the capital of the district it is situated in.

References

Communes of Chlef Province